Peter London (born Peter Lunden; 28 September 1982 in Sweden) is a Swedish bassist. He is best known as the bassist for the Swedish sleaze band Crashdïet, but he also performs as a one-man band, Alter Egon. As Alter Egon, London plays all the instruments himself and sings in Swedish. The songs are mostly about himself and sexual freedom. Since 2015, London has been the bass-player of RAC/pop rock-band Bedårande Barn where Jimmie Åkesson plays keyboard.

London married Swedish model and former Miss Sweden title-holder Isabel Lestapier Winqvist on 25 June 2010 at the Hedvig Eleonora Church in Stockholm. They were divorced in March 2012.

Discography

With Crashdïet

Rest in Sleaze (2005)
The Unattractive Revolution (2007)
Generation Wild (2010)
Savage Playground (2013)
Rust (2019)
Automaton (2022)

With Alter Egon
Alteraktiva Romanser (2008)

With Paradice
Pain And Pleasure (2002)

With Bedårande Barn
 Back To Life - A Tribute To Goodbye To Gravity (Compilation, 2016)
 För Framtids Segrar - Live i Helsingborg (Live album, 2017)
 Karaoke (Digital album, 2017)
 Election Day 18 (Next Chapter) (Digital Album, 2018)
Allt Vi Vill Ha (Digital-Singel, 2018)
Stängda Dörrar (Digital-Singel, 2018)
Live i Sölvesborg (Digital-Album, 2018)

References

External links
Official Crashdïet website

Living people
1982 births
Swedish bass guitarists
21st-century bass guitarists
Crashdïet members